Walter Folger Brown (May 31, 1869January 26, 1961) was an American politician and lawyer who is served as the Postmaster General of the United States from March 5, 1929, to March 4, 1933, under Herbert Hoover's administration.

Biography

Early & personal life
Brown was born in Massillon, Ohio, to Lavinia (née Folger) and James Marshal Brown. He was educated in Toledo Public Schools and Western Reserve Academy. He married Katherin Hafer on September 10, 1903. Brown had no children.

Education
He graduated from Harvard University with a Bachelor of Arts degree in 1892 and later attended Harvard Law School from 1893 to 1894. While living in Ohio he studied law as an apprentice and eventually earned a law license.

Legal career
He practiced law with his father in Toledo from 1894 to 1905. From 1905 to 1927 he practiced law with the firm of Brown, Hahn & Sanger.

Political career
From 1911 to 1912 he was a member of the Ohio Constitutional Convention and later chairman of the Congressional Joint Committee on Reorganization of Executive Departments from 1921 to 1924. In 1927, President Calvin Coolidge appointed him to be the United States Assistant Secretary of Commerce. He held that position until he took the office of Postmaster General on March 5, 1929.

He served as President Hoover's Postmaster General from 1929 until 1933.  He was best known from his involvement in the Air Mail scandal. He was also a delegate to the Republican National Convention in Ohio in 1940 and 1944, and served as the president of the Toledo Humane Society from 1911 until 1961.

Brown died at age 91 in Toledo on January 26, 1961. He was buried next to his wife Katherin Hafer in Woodlawn Cemetery.

See also
United States government role in civil aviation

Further reading
 Air transportation: a management perspective By J. G. Wensveen, 6th Ed., 2007, p. 35.

References

External links

 Walter Folger Brown: The Postmaster General Who Built the U.S. Airline Industry

1869 births
1961 deaths
United States Postmasters General
Hoover administration cabinet members
20th-century American lawyers
20th-century American politicians
Ohio Republicans
Western Reserve Academy alumni
People from Massillon, Ohio
Harvard Law School alumni
Harvard College alumni